The women's 3 metre springboard diving competition at the 2012 Olympic Games in London took place from 3 to 5 August at the Aquatics Centre within the Olympic Park.

China's Wu Minxia won the gold medal and He Zi, also from China, took silver. Laura Sánchez of Mexico won the bronze.

Format
The competition was held in three rounds:

Preliminary round: All 30 divers perform five dives; the top 18 divers advance to the semi-final.
Semi-final: The 18 divers perform five dives; the scores of the qualifications are erased and the top 12 divers advance to the final.
Final: The 12 divers perform five dives; the semi-final scores are erased and the top three divers win the gold, silver and bronze medals accordingly.

Schedule 
All times are British Summer Time (UTC+1)

Results

References

Diving at the 2012 Summer Olympics
2012
2012 in women's diving
Women's events at the 2012 Summer Olympics